Emerik Derenčin was a Hungarian-Croatian nobleman remembered as the commander of the Croatian troops in the 1493 Battle of Krbava Field.

He was a member of the Derencsényi family from the kindred of Balog. Prior to becoming the ban, Derenčin was the military captain of Senj, and the ban of Jajce.

Derencsényi and John Both were named the Ban of Croatia and Dalmatia and Ban of Slavonia in 1493. In the Battle of Krbava Field, the Croats under Derenčin suffered a devastating loss, and Derenčin himself was taken captive and killed.

Family
Derencsényi married Orsolya Zápolya, sister of Stephen Zápolya, the Palatine of Hungary. They had two sons and, probably, a daughter.

References

1493 deaths
Bans of Croatia
Hungarian nobility
Emeric
Year of birth unknown